The 2000–01 Women's National Cricket League season was the fifth season of the Women's National Cricket League, the women's domestic limited overs cricket competition in Australia. The tournament started on 14 October 2000 and finished on 27 January 2001. Defending champions New South Wales Breakers won the tournament for the fifth time after topping the ladder at the conclusion of the group stage and beating Queensland Fire by two games to zero in the finals series.

Ladder

Fixtures

1st final

2nd final

References

 
Women's National Cricket League seasons
 
Women's National Cricket League